Ksenia Lykina and Maša Zec Peškirič defeated Petra Cetkovská and Eva Hrdinová in the final 6–3, 6–4 to win the women's doubles title at the inaugural Sparta Prague Open.

Seeds 

  Carmen Klaschka /  Riza Zalameda (semifinals)
  Lu Jingjing /  Mashona Washington (first round)
  Elena Bovina /  Darya Kustova (semifinals)
  Ksenia Lykina /  Maša Zec Peškirič (champions)

Draw

References 
 Main draw

Sparta Prague Open - Doubles
WTA Prague Open